Koo Hye-sun (born November 9, 1984) is a South Korean actress, singer-songwriter, director and artist. She gained widespread recognition in the television dramas Pure in Heart (2006), The King And I (2007), Boys Over Flowers (2009), Take Care of Us, Captain (2012), Angel Eyes (2014), and Blood (2015).

Career

As actress
Koo Hye-sun entered the entertainment industry after gaining popularity on the Internet as an ulzzang. She used to be a trainee under SM Entertainment, before switching over to DSP Media and preparing to debut in a girl group called Ria. But after it didn't work out she then signed under YG Entertainment. Originally set to debut as a singer (supposedly in a three-member girl group with 2NE1's Park Bom and Sandara Park), YG Entertainment CEO Yang Hyun-suk advised Koo to pursue acting rather than music. She made her debut in a CF for Sambo computers and then made her television debut in the KBS horror series Anagram, and continued to appear in one-act dramas. Her performance as Hye-jin in the 2004 MBC sitcom Nonstop 5 attracted the audience's attention.

Koo soon rose to fame in the 2006 television drama Pure in Heart and surprised critics with her performance in the historical drama The King and I. She then starred in the historical drama Strongest Chil Woo.

Koo rose to fame for her role as Geum Jan-di in the mega hit KBS2 drama Boys Over Flowers opposite Lee Min-ho, which gained her pan-Asia popularity.

After a year in limbo with no broadcasting slot, her first pre-produced drama The Musical finally aired in September 2011. Koo next starred as a female pilot in the SBS series Take Care of Us, Captain, followed by Absolute Darling, the Taiwanese drama adaptation of the manga Absolute Boyfriend.

After two years break from acting career, Koo appears in MBC channel's two-part documentary drama Heo Nanseolheon. She took part in the program's narration and production as well.

Koo then made a small screen comeback acting in SBS's weekend drama Angel Eyes in 2014. She played a legally blind woman who gets her vision back in an operation and decides to embrace life with passion by becoming an emergency rescue worker.

In February 2015, Koo starred in KBS's vampire drama Blood. She plays an arrogant genius physician who entered medical school at a young age of 17. 
Blood suffered low ratings in Korea and was criticized for her acting. On November 6, 2015, Koo was confirmed to be starring in a Chinese drama The Legendary Tycoon which tells the life story of Run Run Shaw, a self-made entertainment mogul from Hong Kong.

Koo was cast in the MBC's weekend drama You're Too Much alongside Uhm Jung-hwa. However, she left the show after two weeks due to health reasons.

In June 2019, Koo signed with HB Entertainment, same agency as her ex-husband Ahn Jae-hyun. Koo contract with HB Entertainment was terminated on April 29, 2020, after it was initiated by her. On July 23, 2020, Koo signed with Mimi Entertainment. On November 8, 2021, Koo signed with IOK Company.

As singer-songwriter
In recent years, Koo has displayed her vocal talents through soundtrack releases as well as digital singles. In 2005, she released her first single "Happy Birthday to You" for Nonstop 5. In 2006, she released the track "Sarang Ga" ("Love Story"), which became the title song of Pure in Heart. In 2012, Koo released her first self-composed soundtrack, titled "Fly Again" for SBS's Take Care of Us, Captain, which she stars in.

Koo released her first album Breath in 2009, an album of new-age music which included her composed song for her friend and singer, Gummy, entitled "Around the Alley". She then released her self composed and written digital single "Brown Hair" in 2010, with the music rearranged by bossa nova pianist Choi In-young. In 2012, Koo released "It's You" and its music video. She not only wrote the music and lyrics of "It's You", but also filmed and edited the music video.
In 2014, Koo released her 5th digital single "Happy", which is also a remake to Seo In-guk's song "Were We Happy". She released another self-written single titled "Must" the same year, which also serves as the soundtrack of her film Daughter.

In 2015, she released a second album titled Breath 2, which serves as a follow up to her 2009 album Breath. The title track "After 10 Years 100 Years" is a remake of the OST from the film The Peach Tree. Koo held her first concert the same year.

In 2016, Koo released the song "Written and Erased", which is a collaboration song of Koo with The Blind. On April 28, she released her first regular album And Spring that consist of 11 tracks including her singles "Stupid", "Brown Hair", and "It's You."

In May 2022, Koo released Piano New Age Best Album on May 6, 2022.

As director
Koo made her debut as a director through her short film The Madonna. The film which was centered around the topic of assisted suicide, debuted at the 2009 Puchon International Fantastic Film Festival. The film was featured in several film events, including the Asiana International Short Film Festival and the Pusan Asian Short Film Festival where it won "Audience Award" category. The Madonna also won the "Spotlight Award" at the 12th Short Shorts Film Festival which was held in Tokyo from June 10 through 20, 2010. She shared that the reason of herself making film was "It's not like I dreamed of becoming a filmmaker since I was young. I'm interested in many things, including music, art and literature, and I thought I could incorporate all those things by making a film."

The following year, Koo directed her first feature-length film Magic. The film was invited and screened at the 6th Jecheon International Music & Film Festival (JIMFF) from August 12 to 17, 2010 and the 23rd Annual Tokyo International Film Festival. She continued directing short films such as You (2010) Fragments of Sweet Memories (2012), as well as trailers for film festivals. Fragment of Sweet Memories was selected as one of Korea's outstanding 3D films, and was shown at the Cinemountain in Busan Cinema Center during the International 3D Festival (I3DF), which Koo serves as the promotional ambassador of. The film was also selected as a finalist for the Seoul Senior Film Festival, and received citation from the Mayor Park Won-soon.

In 2011, Koo established her own company, Koo Hye-sun Film, under which she would produce and film her projects. Her second directorial feature The Peach Tree was the first film made under her newly established production company. She also wrote the theme song and novel version of the film. On October 25, 2012, she was awarded the Minister Commendation at the 14th Annual Republic of Korea Design Award for The Peach Tree.

In 2013, Koo directed a short film for Samsung Galaxy S4, as part of the project "Story of Me and S4". The same year, she served as the jury for the 9th Jecheon International Music and Film Festival.

In 2014, Koo released her fifth directed film, Daughter. Not only did she took part in producing, script-writing and directing of the movie, she also plays the main character as a mother who gives her daughter an oppressive corporal punishment. The film aims to address and make known to society the problems of child abuse. Daughter was invited to Busan International Film Festival.

In 2021, her short film Dark Yellow had a special screening at 25th Bucheon International Fantastic Film Festival on July 11. She addressed a press conference and met with the audience. She also acted in the film as a woman working at a flower shop.

In 2022, Koo was a judge at the Chunsa Film Art Awards 2022 Film Festival.

As artist and an ambassador
Aside from her acting and directional works, Koo participates in a wide range of projects, including writing and drawing as well as ambassador activities. In recognition of her versatility and talents, Koo was voted as the Best Female Artist in the Entertainment Industry in 2012. She also received the Korea Fulfillment Award, and the Ministry Award for "sharing happiness" for her charitable acts.

In 2009, Koo published her first illustrated novel Tango (탱고), centered around a 20-something young girl who goes through two separate relationships to finally mature into a woman. The book was a bestseller, selling 30,000 copies within a week. Its release coincided with her first solo art exhibition, also titled "Tango" which was held in July 2009 at La Mer Gallery and attracted a total of 10,000 visitors. The exhibition featured around 40 of Koo's illustrations, some from her novel. She held her second art exhibition in 2012, titled "Afterimage" at the Hangaram Design Arts Center in the Seoul Arts Center. She donated all proceeds from the sale of her artwork toward purchasing "clean cars" (germ-free automobiles) for the Korea Leukemia Patient Group.

From 17 to 31 August 2013, she held exhibition entitled "Anything That Leaves Yearning Is All Beautiful". The same year, Koo attended the Hong Kong Contemporary Art Fair. The illustration poster of her cat 'Mango' will be sold at this exhibition, where the profit will be donated to charity organization ‘Community Chest Hong Kong’. Koo was also appointed as the 2013 Cheongju International Craft Biennale (CICB) ambassador, as well as the ambassador for ArtisTree, an organization to encourage arts.

Personal life
On March 11, 2016, Koo was confirmed to be dating her Blood co-star Ahn Jae-hyun since April 2015. The couple officially registered their marriage at the Gangnam district office on May 20, 2016, and married on May 21, 2016. They announced that instead of holding a wedding party, they would donate the money to the pediatric ward of Severance Hospital. The pair appeared in the reality show Newlywed Diary produced by Na Young-seok, which showcased their married life.

In August 2019, it was reported Ahn requested a divorce from Koo. On August 18, 2019, Koo posted an image of text messages between her and her husband Ahn Jae-hyun discussing divorce to her Instagram account. Another image was posted with a caption that explained she wanted to preserve her marriage, while Ahn did not. The posts were later deleted. Koo suffered numerous malicious comments on social media every time she criticized Ahn publicly. Ahn submitted an application to the Seoul Family Court on September 9, 2019, for divorce against Koo, and it was delivered to Koo on September 18, 2019.

On September 1, 2019, Koo revealed in Instagram post that she would be taking a break from the entertainment industry to resume college.

Philanthropy 
On July 12, 2022, Koo made a donation to her alma mater, Sungkyunkwan University, to help the needy through the Senior Love Learning Support Fund. The prize money came from the 24th Short Shorts International Short Film Festival.

In December 2022, Koo donated a trusted pet companion animal separation anxiety and anxiety solution to Korea Abandoned Animal Welfare Association.

Filmography

As actress

Film

Television series

Narration

Reality show

Music video

As director

Feature film

Short film

Trailer

Discography

Albums

Singles

Concert

Bibliography

Art exhibitions

Fashion
André Kim's Fashion Show with Song Chang-eui (2009)
Lie Sang Bong's Fashion Show at CICB (2013)

Ambassadorship
 2012: Goodwill Ambassador for International 3D Festival
 2013: Promotional Ambassador for Cheongju International Craft Biennale 
 2013: Promotional Ambassador for Artistree 
 2013: Honorary Ambassador for 14th Persons with Disabilities Film Festival
 2015: Honorary Ambassador for Seoul 2015 International Blind Sports Association (IBSA) World Games
 2015: Honorary Ambassador for Korean Leukemia Association
 2016: Honorary Ambassador for Social Contribution Donation Bank
 2022: Ambassador for the 2nd Global Art Fair
 2022: Public Relations Ambassador for Yangju Barrier-Free Film Festival 2022

Awards and nominations

References

External links

Living people
South Korean artists
South Korean television actresses
South Korean film actresses
South Korean screenwriters
South Korean women film directors
Sungkyunkwan University alumni
Seoul Institute of the Arts alumni
People from Seoul
People from Incheon
1984 births
South Korean expatriates in England